Little Women is a British 2017 BBC television historical drama adaptation of the 1868-69 two-volume novel by Louisa May Alcott. Adapted by Heidi Thomas, the miniseries was directed by Vanessa Caswill. The three one-hour episodes were first broadcast on BBC One on Boxing Day 2017 and the following two days. The cast includes Emily Watson, Michael Gambon and Angela Lansbury. Production was supported by PBS and the miniseries was shown as part of its Masterpiece anthology.

Cast

Production
Little Women was commissioned by BBC Drama in May 2017, along with 10 other television dramas. The three-part series was adapted by Heidi Thomas, who created Call the Midwife, and directed by Vanessa Caswill. It was produced by Playground Television UK with PBS Masterpiece.

Little Women is set in Concord, Massachusetts, but was filmed in County Wicklow, Ireland. Filming took place in the coastal town of Bray and at the Ardmore Studios from July 2017.

Irish costume designer Eimer Ní Mhaoldomhnaigh created the clothing for the miniseries.

Episodes

Reception
The UK media reception for the programme was very positive. Euan Ferguson in The Observer said: "The grit and pain of the girls' struggles to define themselves, in that fast-changing age, in that still young country, rang wholly fresh and credible... all in all, a triumph". Ben Lawrence of The Daily Telegraph described it as: "the single best thing on television over Christmas... a delight from start to finish – a poignant, funny version of Louisa May Alcott's 1869 novel which made the four March sisters seem like both exciting new creations and old friends," while Alex O'Connell in The Times said: "writer Heidi Thomas (Call the Midwife, Cranford) reminds us why we love it and shows us the classic in a bright new light." Mike Hale of The New York Times had a more negative review of the programme saying that: "What we get is a fairly faithful rendition of the book’s events that lacks the warmth and depth of feeling that make the book worth reading." Ben Allen of the Radio Times felt the online reception amongst the public to be more mixed, with some viewers preferring the interpretation of earlier filmed adaptations, while others were left moved but conflicted by the accurate depiction of the novel's conclusion. Episode 1 was seen by 5.17 million viewers and Episode 3 by 4.38 million according to BARB's consolidated viewing data; whereas Episode 2 was watched by fewer than 4.31 million viewers and thus did not feature in BBC1's top 30 most viewed programmes for week ending 31 December 2017.

References

External links
 

2017 British television series debuts
2017 British television series endings
2010s British drama television series
English-language television shows
BBC television dramas
2010s British television miniseries
Television series about the American Civil War
Television series based on Little Women